Lafourche Parish Public Schools is a school district headquartered in Thibodaux, Louisiana.

The district serves all of Lafourche Parish, including a portion of Des Allemands.

Jerome "Dee" Richard, current member of the Louisiana House of Representatives from Lafourche Parish, one of only two Independents in the chamber, served two stints on the Lafourche Parish School Board, from 1982 to 1984 and again from 1986 to 1994.

Residents of select portions of Lafourche Parish (particularly in parts of Grand Bois and Bourg) may attend schools in the Terrebonne Parish School District. Students with certain medical problems and children of certain teachers residing in Terrebonne Parish may attend school in the Lafourche Parish Public Schools only if superintendents of both systems approve it on a case-by-case basis.

History

The school district made academic improvement between 2015 and 2016; it received an "A" grade from the Louisiana Department of Education in 2016 since its score had risen to 102.2, crossing the 100 points needed for an "A" rank, from 95.8.

School uniforms
Students are required to wear school uniforms.

Schools

Secondary schools
High schools
 Central Lafourche High School (Mathews, Unincorporated area) 
 South Lafourche High School (Galliano, Unincorporated area) 
 Thibodaux High School (Thibodaux)

Middle schools
 Bayou Blue Middle School (Unincorporated area)
 East Thibodaux Middle School (Thibodaux)
 Golden Meadow Middle School (Golden Meadow)
 Larose-Cut Off Middle School (Larose, Unincorporated area)
 Lockport Middle School (Lockport)
 Raceland Middle School (Raceland, Unincorporated area)
 Sixth Ward Middle School (Unincorporated area)
 West Thibodaux Middle School (Thibodaux)

Elementary schools

Bayou Blue Elementary School
Bayou Boeuf Elementary School
Chackbay Elementary School
 the school had 485 students. As this was above the school's capacity, that year the district considered rezoning 125 students to Bayou Boeuf, which had experienced a decline in the number of students attending school there.
Cut Off Elementary School
Galliano Elementary School
Golden Meadow Lower Elementary School
Golden Meadow Upper Elementary School
W. S. Lafargue Elementary School
Lockport Lower Elementary School
Lockport Upper Elementary School
North Larose Elementary School
Raceland Lower Elementary School
Raceland Upper Elementary School
South Larose Elementary School
St. Charles Elementary School
South Thibodaux Elementary School
Thibodaux Elementary School

Former schools

Consolidated in the 1960s:
Golden Meadow High School
Larose-Cut Off High School
Lockport High School
Raceland High School
Schools for black people:
C.M. Washington Colored High School/C.M. Washington Colored Training School - Thibodaux
Raceland Colored School

References

External links

 Lafourche Parish Public Schools
 

School districts in Louisiana
Public Schools